"Outro" is a song by French electronic music artists M83, released as the final track on the group's sixth studio album, Hurry Up, We're Dreaming (2011). It is a dramatic, symphonic rock song which has evoked "heartbreak, nostalgia, anticipation, jubilation and triumph".

The song has been frequently used in a number of media, including commercials, movies, trailers and television shows. In 2015, it charted for several weeks in France. By 2014, it had been so widely used that Christopher Rosen of the Huffington Post opined "Sorry, Everyone, It's Time To Retire M83's 'Outro'".

Certifications

References

2011 songs
M83 (band) songs